Zak (also Romanized as Zāk) is a village in Darzab Rural District, in the Central District of Mashhad County, Razavi Khorasan Province, Iran. At the 2006 census, its population was 1,095, in 276 families.

Zak is located, 6 km north of Tus Iran. The distance of this village from Mashhad is about 36 km. Most people are engaged in agriculture and animal husbandry, and most are engaged in Products such as wheat, barley and sugar beet. 

The geographical coordinates of Zak village are as follows:

Latitude: 36.541084 °

Longitude: 59.557036 °

Elevation: 1066 m

The village has about 300 private villa gardens that are used for summer purposes.

References 

Populated places in Mashhad County